Abu Zura'ah al-Mu'ammari al-Jurjani was a poet of the Samanid era, who is only known from the writings of the historian Awfi (died 1242). In the text, an unnamed amir of Khurasan asks Abu Zura'ah if he is able to write poems on the level of Rudaki. He subsequently composed three verses, declaring his superiority over Rudaki.

References

Sources 
 

Samanid-period poets
Year of birth unknown
Year of death unknown